Marcel Mosch (born 20 May 1993) is a German footballer who plays for Sportfreunde Siegen. He made his 3. Liga debut for the club in December 2012, as a substitute for Fabian Bäcker in a 1–0 home defeat against Hallescher FC.

External links

1993 births
21st-century German people
Living people
German footballers
Association football forwards
Kickers Offenbach players
SV Seligenporten players
SV Wacker Burghausen players
Borussia Fulda players
Sportfreunde Siegen players
3. Liga players
Regionalliga players
Oberliga (football) players